Lucy Peters Wilson Benson (August 25, 1927 – July 17, 2021) was an American government official who served as the Under Secretary of State for Arms Control and International Security Affairs from 1977 to 1980. When Benson was named to this post, it was the highest position ever held by a woman in the United States Department of State.

Prior to joining the State Department, Benson served as President of the League of Women Voters (1968 to 1974) and Massachusetts Secretary of Human Services from 1975 to 1977. She has also been a member of the Lafayette College Board of Trustees since 1985.

References

1927 births
2021 deaths
United States Under Secretaries of State
Massachusetts Secretaries of Health and Human Services
Carter administration personnel
Lafayette College trustees
People from New York City